The Royal Arcade is a historic shopping arcade in the central business district of  Melbourne, Victoria, Australia. Opened in 1870, it connects Bourke Street Mall to Little Collins Street, with a side offshoot to Elizabeth Street. It is the oldest surviving arcade in Australia, known for its elegant light-filled interior, and the large carved mythic figures of Gog and Magog flanking the southern entry.

Along with Melbourne's other Victorian era arcade, the nearby Block Arcade, it is a tourist icon of the city, and forms part of the network of lanes and arcades in the CBD.

The arcade is listed on the Victorian Heritage Register, as well as by the National Trust of Australia. It also forms part of Melbourne's Golden Mile heritage walk.

History

Designed by Charles Webb, who won a competition in 1868, the arcade features a high glass roof and rows of arched windows to the storerooms above each shop. It was formally opened by the City Lord Mayor on 2 May, 1870. Remaining unchanged for the next two decades, a number of features were then altered and added.

At the south end is the arcade's most famous feature, the carved mythical figures of Gog and Magog, flanking 'Gaunt's clock', which triggers the arms of the figures to strike bells each hour, while the north end features a figure of Father Time, all added in 1893. Gaunt was Melbourne's best known clock-maker at the time. 

The arcade originally ended at the south end, with an entrance to a Turkish Bath, but this was opened up to Little Collins Street in 1902, along with the creation of the large arched niche, the same year as the Elizabeth Street extension was added to the west side. Over the years  the shopfronts were frequently altered, with all changed into bow fronted windows in 1890-1894, many then altered again, various central kiosks were added, and the black and white chequered floor laid in 1934. In the 1920s, the cast iron verandah was removed, but was recreated in the 1990s.

In 2002-04 a major refurbishment repaired and restored many historic features, including the recreation the 1894 shopfronts, bringing a consistency to the shopfronts once more. In c2010, the facade was repainted in a yellow and white colour scheme, with gilded highlights.

Access
The arcade's main entry faces Bourke Street, and it connects south through to Little Collins Street, with an extension in the centre running west to Elizabeth Street. There is also a connection to the smaller Hub Arcade near the Little Collins Street end.

Gallery

See also
Lanes and arcades of Melbourne

References

External links

Royal Arcade website
Enter the Arcade with Google Street View

Shopping arcades in Australia
Heritage-listed buildings in Melbourne
Shopping malls established in 1869
1869 establishments in Australia
Bourke Street
Buildings and structures in Melbourne City Centre
Landmarks in Melbourne